Rocky Branch is a stream in Moniteau and Morgan Counties in the U.S. state of Missouri. It is a tributary of Burris Fork.

Rocky Branch (historically called "Rocky Creek") was so named on account of the rocky character of the creek bed.

See also
List of rivers of Missouri

References

Rivers of Moniteau County, Missouri
Rivers of Morgan County, Missouri
Rivers of Missouri